Julia Nikolayevna Obertas, married name: Horak (born 19 June 1984) is a former pair skater who represented Ukraine until 2000 and then Russia until the end of her career. She is best known for her partnership with Sergei Slavnov, with whom she competed from 2003 to 2007. They are the 2005 European silver medalists. Earlier, she competed with Alexei Sokolov for Russia and Dmytro Palamarchuk for Ukraine. With Palamarchuk, she became a two-time (1998–1999) World Junior champion.

Career

Early career 
Obertas began skating at age 5. She initially competed with Dmytro Palamarchuk representing Ukraine. They won the 1998 and 1999 World Junior Championships. They also won the 1997 and 1998 Junior Grand Prix Final. They then began competing on the senior level. At the 2000 World Championships, Obertas/Palamarchuk were 10th after the short program but during the free skate Palamarchuk caught an edge (right skate) while executing an overhead lift with Obertas – she was uninjured in the resulting fall but he hit his head on the ice. No medical attention was immediately offered at the event in Nice, France. Palamarchuk lay on the ice for several minutes before getting up and leaving the ice on his own but then lost consciousness and was taken to hospital – no damage was found but he was kept overnight for observation. The pair ended their partnership shortly afterward. Obertas moved to Russia as her mother had remarried and the family decided to settle in Saint Petersburg.

Partnership with Sokolov 
In the summer of 2000, Obertas teamed up with Alexei Sokolov and began to represent Russia, coached by Ludmila Velikova and Nikolai Velikov. They trained at the Yubileyny rink in Saint Petersburg. After two fourth-place finishes at Russian Nationals, they won bronze in 2003. They earned a berth in the 2003 European Championships, where they placed fifth, and to the 2003 World Championships, where they finished eighth.

Partnership with Slavnov 

Obertas had begun dating another one of the Velikovs' students, Sergei Slavnov, and in August 2003, they decided to skate together, switching coaches to Tamara Moskvina who also worked at Yubileyny.

At the 2004 Skate America, shortly after Tatiana Totmianina's accident, Obertas fell out of an overhead lift, a hand-to-hand lasso lift, but Slavnov managed to catch her to prevent her head hitting the ice. The pair won silver at the 2005 European Championships and were fifth at the World Championships. During the 2005-06 season, they were fourth at Europeans, and then finished eighth at both the Olympics and Worlds.

At the start of the 2006-07 season, Obertas/Slavnov decided to return to Ludmila Velikova. The pair won bronze at 2006 Trophée Eric Bompard and finished 6th at 2006 NHK Trophy. At the 2007 Russian Championships, they won the silver medal and were sent to the 2007 European Championships where they finished 4th. They did not compete at Worlds.

The pair announced they would miss the 2007-08 season as the result of an injury to Obertas. In summer 2008, they said they would miss the start of the 2008-09 season, but might compete at Russian Nationals. In autumn 2008, Obertas participated in the Russia 1 ice show Star Ice, skating with the Russian actor Alexander Peskov. Obertas/Slavnov did not compete at Russian nationals and ended their career.

Obertas/Slavnov performed some quadruple twists in competition.

Personal life 
Obertas and Slavnov dated from 2002 to 2008. In 2010, Obertas married Czech figure skater Radek Horák. After spending some time coaching in Italy, she and her husband now coach in Stockholm, Sweden.

Programs

With Slavnov

With Sokolov

Results

With Slavnov for Russia

With Sokolov for Russia

With Palamarchuk for Ukraine

References

External links

Navigation

1984 births
Russian female pair skaters
Ukrainian female pair skaters
Olympic figure skaters of Russia
Figure skaters at the 2006 Winter Olympics
Living people
European Figure Skating Championships medalists
World Junior Figure Skating Championships medalists
Sportspeople from Dnipro